Hull-Daisetta High School is a public high school located in Daisetta, Texas (USA) and classified as a 2A school by the UIL.  It is part of the Hull-Daisetta Independent School District located in southeastern Liberty County.  In 2015, the school was rated "Met Standard" by the Texas Education Agency.

Athletics
The Hull-Daisetta Bobcats compete in these sports - 

Cross Country, Volleyball, Football, Basketball, Tennis, Track, Softball & Baseball

State Titles
Football - 
1979(1A)

State Finalists
Football - 
1961(1A)

References

External links
Hull-Daisetta ISD

Schools in Liberty County, Texas
Public high schools in Texas